Shoulder to Shoulder is a 1974 BBC television serial and book relating the history of the women's suffrage movement, both edited by Midge Mackenzie. The drama series grew out of discussions between Mackenzie and the actress and singer Georgia Brown, who was dissatisfied at the lack of decent roles for women in TV drama. Brown enlisted the producer Verity Lambert in the project she and Mackenzie were devising to dramatise the struggle for women's suffrage, and the three women presented the idea to the BBC, which gave approval for the series. Originally they had hoped to use only female script writers but this proved impracticable. Male writers were used and the three female originators of the project later said they needed to remove from their scripts a number of 'innuendoes, misconceptions and untruths' indicative of what Georgia Brown termed "the male point of view".

The TV series, directed by Waris Hussein and Moira Armstrong, dramatized the fight for the right to vote for British women. It covered the period from the 1890s to 1919 and followed the suffrage movement as it was influenced by the Pankhursts: Richard, Emmeline, Christabel and Sylvia, and Annie Kenney. The series was written by Douglas Livingstone, Alan Plater, Ken Taylor and Hugh Whitemore. The series was a co-production between the BBC and Warner Bros. Television. The designers were Susan Spence, Evan Hercules and Eileen Diss; costumes were by Joan Ellacott. Emmeline Pankhurst was played by Sian Phillips; her daughters Christabel and Sylvia by Patricia Quinn and Angela Down. Michael Gough played Emmeline's husband, Dr Richard Pankhurst. Georgia Brown played Annie Kenney, a mill worker who joined the cause and eventually became a dynamic speaker for the movement. Lady Constance Lytton, an upper class activist for women's suffrage who underwent force feeding in prison, was played by Judy Parfitt. Sally Miles played Flora Drummond; Sheila Allen, Emmeline Pethick-Lawrence. Fulton Mackay played the socialist leader Keir Hardie, Robert Hardy was Asquith and Bob Hoskins played Jack Dunn.

The book Shoulder to Shoulder documents the lives and works of some of Britain's leading suffragettes. It includes many excerpts from their speeches, diaries, letters, memoirs, other writings and various newspaper cuttings, photographs, and cartoons.

See also
 Iron Jawed Angels (2004 film)
 Suffragette (2015 film)
 Suffs (2022 musical)

References

External links

1974 British television series debuts
1974 British television series endings
1970s British drama television series
BBC television dramas
1970s British television miniseries
English-language television shows
Films directed by Waris Hussein
Films scored by Stanley Myers
Women's suffrage in the United Kingdom
Cultural depictions of Emmeline Pankhurst